The following is a list of notable current and former residents of Teaneck, New Jersey.

(B) denotes that the person was born in Teaneck.

Academics and science
 Robert S. Browne (1924-2004), economist who founded African-American self-help programs.
 Frank Chapman (1864–1945), ornithologist
 Stephen P. Cohen (1945–2017), scholar on Middle Eastern affairs who founded the Institute for Middle East Peace and Development
 Herbert Dardik (1935–2020), vascular surgeon who served as the chief of vascular surgery at Englewood Hospital and Medical Center
 Frank Gill (born 1941), ornithologist
 Alan Kadish (born 1956), president and CEO of Touro College
 Peter Kenen (1932–2012), economist who served as provost of Columbia University
 Karl Meyer (1899–1990), German-born biochemist
 Clifford Nass (1958–2013), professor at Stanford University; expert on human-computer interaction
 Jane S. Richardson (born 1941), biochemist and developer of ribbon diagrams of protein structure
 Jacob J. Schacter (born 1950), senior scholar at the Center for the Jewish Future at Yeshiva University; editor of a number of volumes about Rabbi Joseph Soloveitchik
 Benjamin Sommer (born 1964), Professor of Bible at The Jewish Theological Seminary of America and a Senior Fellow at the Shalom Hartman Institute
 Yvonne Thornton (born 1947), physician and author
 Helen M. Walker (1891–1983), statistician and researcher; first female president of the American Statistical Association
 Alan Westin (1929–2013), Columbia University professor; pioneer in studying issues related to information privacy

Arts

Architecture
 Louis Bourgeois (1856–1930), architect of the Bahá'í House of Worship
 Alan Hantman (born 1942), architect who served as the 10th Architect of the Capitol, from February 1997 until February 2007.

Authors, journalists and publishers

 Shalom Auslander (born 1970), author of Foreskin's Lament: A Memoir (2007)
 Peter Balakian (born 1951), poet, writer and academic
 Cathy Bao Bean (born 1942), author
 Jim Bishop (1907–1987), journalist and author of the bestselling book The Day Lincoln Was Shot
 Louis Black, co-founder of The Austin Chronicle and the annual South by Southwest film and music festival
 Don Bolles (1928–1976), investigative reporter killed in a Mob-related car bombing
 Richard Nelson Bolles (1927–2017), clergyman and author of the best-selling job-hunting book, What Color is Your Parachute?
 Rachel Kramer Bussel (born 1975), author, columnist and editor, specializing in erotica
 George Cain (1943–2010), author of Blueschild Baby
 Louise DeSalvo (1942–2018), author
 Shammai Engelmayer (born 1945), rabbi, journalist and author
 Howard Fast (1914–2003), novelist, author of Spartacus
 Jeff Gottesfeld (born 1956), author of Anne Frank and Me and The Tree in the Courtyard; screenwriter, Broken Bridges; television writer, The Young and the Restless
 Steven Hartov (born 1953), American-Israeli author of fiction and non-fiction works, journalist, screenwriter and lecturer in international security affairs.
 David Heatley (born 1974), cartoonist, illustrator, graphic designer and musician
 Marilyn Henry (1953–2011), journalist, historian and archivist for matters pertaining to Holocaust reparations, survivor benefits and art looted by the Nazis
 Robert Hilferty (1959–2009), journalist, filmmaker and AIDS activist
 John Hoerr (1930–2015), journalist and historian best known for his work on organized labor, industry, and politics
 Mike Kelly, columnist for The Record; author of Color Lines, a book about the shooting of an African-American teenager by a white Teaneck police officer
 Neil Kleid (born 1975), cartoonist who received a 2003 Xeric Award grant for his graphic novella Ninety Candles (2004)
 Lisa Lucas, executive director of the National Book Foundation and senior vice president at Knopf Doubleday
 Barry N. Malzberg (born 1939), science fiction author
 Brian Morton (born 1955), author of Starting Out in the Evening
 Nicholasa Mohr (born 1938), author and academic whose first novel Nilda was about the Nuyorican experience
 Gitl Schaechter-Viswanath (born 1958), Yiddish language poet
 John A. Williams (1925–2015), author, journalist and academic whose novel The Man Who Cried I Am was a bestseller in 1967

Fine arts
 Robert Barry (born 1936), conceptual artist
 Charles Harbutt (1935–2015), photographer
 Renaldo Kuhler (1931–2013), scientific illustrator(B)
 Thomas Nozkowski (1944–2019), contemporary painter(B)
 Frank R. Paul (1884–1963), illustrator of science fiction
 Claire Porter (born 1942), choreographer
 Paul Shambroom (born 1956), photographer
 Chuck Stewart (1927–2017), photographer
 Henry Wessel Jr. (1942–2018), photographer

Fashion
 Rachel Antonoff (born 1981), fashion designer(B)
 Marc Jacobs (born 1963), designer and artistic director for Louis Vuitton
 Lynn Kohlman (1946–2008), fashion model

Movies, stage and television

 Amy Aquino (born 1957), television, film and stage actress who has appeared in TV series including Brooklyn Bridge, ER and Being Human(B)
 Ed Ames (born 1927), popular singer and actor, known for playing Mingo in the television series Daniel Boone
 Paul Attanasio (born 1959), screenwriter and executive producer of the TV series House
 De'Adre Aziza (born 1977), Broadway stage actress
 Pat Battle (born 1959), WNBC-TV's New Jersey bureau reporter; weekend anchor for Today in New York
 Eitan Bernath (born 2002), celebrity chef
 Roger Birnbaum (born 1950), film producer who owns Spyglass Entertainment
 Ben Blank (1921–2009), television graphics innovator
 Philip Bosco (1930–2018), character actor 
 Chris Brancato (born 1962), Hollywood writer and producer of Sci Fi Channel's First Wave and the film Species II
 Colleen Broomall (born 1983), actress and journalist
 Carolee Carmello (born 1962), actress best known for her performances in Broadway musicals
 Syd Cassyd (1908–2000), television pioneer who was the founder of the Academy of Television Arts & Sciences(B)
 Gaius Charles (born 1983), actor, Friday Night Lights
 Jennifer Cody (born 1975), actress
 Joe DiPietro (born 1961), playwright
 Jamie Donnelly (born 1947), actress best known as Jan, one of the Pink Ladies from the film version of Grease
 Sheldon Epps (born 1952), director and producer of television and theatrical works
 Hunter Foster (born 1969), Broadway actor
 Nely Galán (born 1963), independent producer, former president of entertainment for Telemundo, and creator of the FOX reality series The Swan
 John A. Gambling (1930–2004), radio personality
 John B. Gambling (1897–1974), radio personality
 Lee Garlington (born 1953), actress(B)
 Susan Gordon (1949–2011), child actress in film and television
 Jess Harnell (born 1963), the voice of Wakko Warner on Animaniacs and announcer of America's Funniest Home Videos
 Jay Jason (1915–2001), Borscht Belt comedian
 Jeffrey Kramer (born 1945), film and television actor and producer
 David P. Levin (born 1958), producer/writer/director for MTV, TV Land, and A&E Network
 Ilana Levine (born 1963), actress who made her first on-screen appearance as Andrea Spinelli in the HBO comedy-drama series Tanner '88
 Damon Lindelof (born 1973), co-creator and executive producer of the TV series Lost
 Leonard Maltin (born 1950), film critic and author of Leonard Maltin's Movie Guide
 Patricia McBride (born 1942), ballerina who performed with the New York City Ballet for 30 years
 Bob McGrath (1932–2022), played "Bob" on TV's Sesame Street, the longest-lasting human character on the program
 Julianne Michelle (born 1987), film actress
 Zalmen Mlotek (born 1954), conductor, pianist, musical arranger, accompanist, composer; artistic director of the National Yiddish Theatre – Folksbiene
 Susan Morrow (1931–1985), actress, star of The Savage(B)
 Ozzie Nelson (1906–1975) and Harriet Nelson (1909–1994), from The Adventures of Ozzie and Harriet
 Ricky Nelson (1940–1985), son of Ozzie and Harriet; actor (Rio Bravo); musician elected to the Rock and Roll Hall of Fame in 1987
 Christopher O'Neal (born 1994), actor who appears on Nickelodeon's How to Rock
 Sarah Jessica Parker (born 1965), actress, played Carrie Bradshaw on HBO's Sex and the City
 Charles Payne (born 1960), Fox Business Network television show host
 Danielle Pinnock (born 1988), actress, comedian and writer
 Randall Pinkston (born 1950), correspondent for CBS News
 Dana Reeve (1961–2006), actress, singer, activist for disability causes; wife of Christopher Reeve(B)
 Robert Ridgely (1931–1997), actor and voice-over artist; appeared in many Mel Brooks movies and in Boogie Nights
 David Rothenberg (born 1933), Broadway producer and prisoners' rights activist
 Rick Schwartz (born ), film producer
 Seret Scott (born 1949), actress, director, and playwright, best known for her roles in the films Losing Ground and Pretty Baby.
 Matt Servitto (born 1965), actor known for his role on The Sopranos as FBI agent Dwight Harris(B)
 Lawrence Sher (born 1970), cinematographer
 Paul Sorvino (1939–2022), actor
 Josh Sussman (born 1983), actor
 Bill Timoney (born 1958), actor, director, script writer and producer(B)
 Judy Tyler (1933–1957), actress who played Princess Summerfallwinterspring on Howdy Doody and starred opposite Elvis Presley in Jailhouse Rock
 John Ventimiglia (born 1963), actor; played Artie Bucco on The Sopranos

Music

 Nat Adderley (1931–2000), jazz cornet and trumpet player
 Nat Adderley, Jr. (born 1955), music arranger who spent much of his career with Luther Vandross
 Ray Barretto (1929–2006), conga drummer and bandleader
 Eef Barzelay (born 1970), chief songwriter, singer, and guitarist of alt-country indie rock band Clem Snide
 Bernard Belle, composer, producer and musician
 Regina Belle (born 1963), Grammy Award-winning singer
 Roni Ben-Hur (born 1962), bebop jazz guitarist
 Louis Black (born 1950), co-founder of South by Southwest Music, Film, and Interactive Conference and Festival
 Miles Bonny (born 1980), record producer, singer-songwriter, trumpeter and DJ
 Pat Boone (born 1934), star pop singer from the 1950s whose best-known hits were Ain't That a Shame and Love Letters in the Sand
 Donald Byrd (1932–2013), jazz trumpeter
 Cakes da Killa (born as Rashard Bradshaw), rapper
 Brendan Canty (born 1966), drummer of indie rock band Fugazi
 Gordon Chambers (born ), singer-songwriter whose work includes "If You Love Me" by Brownstone
 Ray Chew (born ), music director
 Graham Clarke (born 1970), musician, songwriter, arranger, and entertainer
 Brenda Miller Cooper (1916–2008), operatic soprano
 Johnny Copeland (1937–1997), blues guitarist and singer
 Shemekia Copeland (born 1979), blues singer
 DMX (born as Earl Simmons, 1970–2021), rapper and actor
 Plácido Domingo (born 1941), operatic tenor
 Ray Drummond (born 1946), jazz bassist
 Randy Edelman (born 1947), film and TV score composer
 Jon Faddis (born 1953), jazz trumpeter, conductor, composer and educator
 Jon Garrison (born 1944), operatic tenor
 Jimmy Gnecco (born 1973), musician from the Ours
 Christine Goerke (born 1969), Grammy Award-winning dramatic soprano
 Wally Gold (1928–1998), singer, songwriter, producer, music industry executive, best known for co-writing "It's Now or Never", "Good Luck Charm", and "It's My Party"
 Lesley Gore (1946–2015), singer, songwriter, actress and activist known for her pop hit "It's My Party"
 Florence Greenberg (1913–1995), record producer who discovered The Shirelles
 Ferde Grofé (1892–1972), composer and arranger, best known for his Grand Canyon Suite
 Roland Hanna (1932–2002), jazz pianist, composer and teacher
 Joe Harnell (1924–2005), composer and arranger
 Al Hibbler (1915–2001), R&B singer; later civil rights activist
 Ronald Isley (born 1941), co-founder and lead singer of the Isley Brothers
 Rudolph Isley (born 1939), founding member of the Isley Brothers
 Milt Jackson (1923–1999), jazz vibraphonist
 Moe Jaffe (1901–1972), songwriter
 Jodeci, R&B group of the early 1990s
 J. J. Johnson (1924–2001), jazz trombonist
 Kevin Jonas (born 1987), background vocalist and lead guitarist for the Jonas Brothers
 Sam Jones (1924–1981), jazz double bassist, cellist and composer
 Thad Jones (1923–1986), jazz trumpeter, composer and bandleader
 Ben Jorgensen (born 1983), lead singer of Armor for Sleep
 Don "Magic" Juan (born 1950), merengue and hip-hop artist, from the 1990s merengue group Proyecto Uno
 Ulysses Kay (1917–1995), composer
 Ben E. King (1938–2015), singer, "Stand by Me"
 Michael Korie, librettist and lyricist, whose works include Grey Gardens
 Anthony Laciura (born 1951), character tenor for the Metropolitan Opera
 Ezra Laderman (1924–2015), contemporary classical music composer who served as Dean and Professor at the Yale School of Music
 Yusef Lateef (1920–2013), jazz multi-instrumentalist and composer
 Lil' Kim (born 1974), rapper; born Kimberly Jones
 Amy London (born 1957), jazz singer
 Mario (born 1986), R&B singer
 Master Gee (born Guy O'Brien), co-founder of the hip hop group The Sugarhill Gang, best known for "Rapper's Delight"
 Elliot Mazer (1941–2021), audio engineer and record producer best known for his work with Linda Ronstadt, Neil Young, Bob Dylan, The Band and Janis Joplin
 Rose Marie McCoy (1922–2015), songwriter
 Clyde McPhatter (1932–1972), R&B singer who founded The Drifters
 Allan Monk (born 1942), baritone opera singer
 Melissa Morgan (born 1980), jazz vocalist
 The Notorious B.I.G. (1972–1997), rapper; born Christopher Wallace
 Duke Pearson (1932–1980), jazz pianist and composer
 Bernard Purdie (born 1941), prolific session drummer
 Rufus Reid (born 1944), jazz bassist and music educator
 Richie Ranno (born 1950), guitarist best known as a member of Starz
 Scott Robinson (born 1959), jazz musician best known for his work with various styles of saxophone
 Paul A. Rothchild (1935–1995), music producer of the late 1960s and 1970s, best known for his work with The Doors
 Ernie Royal (1921–1983), jazz trumpeter
 Hilton Ruiz (1952–2006), jazz pianist, Afro-Cuban style
 Juelz Santana (born 1982), rapper
 Linda Scott (born 1945), singer best known for her 1961 hit "I've Told Every Little Star"
 Alan Silvestri (born 1950), film composer
 Ray Simpson (born 1954), lead singer of the Village People since 1980
 Dave Sirulnick (born 1964), executive vice president for Multiplatform Production, News and Music at MTV
 Phoebe Snow (1952–2011), singer-songwriter born Phoebe Laub, who adopted the name of a train that ran through Teaneck, the Phoebe Snow
 DJ Spinderella (born Deidra Muriel Roper, 1971), DJ for the hip-hop group Salt-n-Pepa
 Trey Songz (born 1984), R&B singer
 Joris Teepe, jazz bassist, composer, arranger and big-band leader
 Raymond Torres-Santos (born 1958), classical composer, pianist, arranger, conductor and Professor of Music at CUNY
 McCoy Tyner (1938–2020), jazz pianist known for his work with the John Coltrane Quartet
 Lenny White (born 1949), drummer described as "one of the founding fathers of jazz fusion"
 Eliot Zigmund (born 1945), jazz drummer; has worked extensively as a session musician

Business and industry

 Bob Beaumont (1932–2011), founder of Citicar, an electric automobile manufacturer from 1974 to 1977
 Matthew Hiltzik (born 1972), CEO and president of Hiltzik Strategies, a strategic consulting and communications firm
 Les Otten (born 1949), former CEO of the American Skiing Company
 John G. Ryan (1910–1989), publisher who was president of P.F. Collier and Son Corporation, which distributed the Collier's Encyclopedia
 Paul Singer (born 1944), founder of Elliott Management Corporation
 Lynn Tilton (born 1959), businesswoman
 Bill Zanker (born 1954), creator of The Learning Annex

Government and politics

 Vincent M. Battle (born 1940), former United States Ambassador to Lebanon (B)
 William W. Bennett (1841–1912), property manager of the William Walter Phelps estate, who served as the first Mayor of Teaneck, New Jersey
 Leonie Brinkema (born 1944), U.S. District Court judge in the Zacarias Moussaoui case (B)
 Thomas Ryan Byrne (1923–2014), career diplomat who served as United States Ambassador to the Kingdom of Norway (B)
 Gale D. Candaras (born 1947), member of the Massachusetts Senate
 Donna Christian-Christensen (born 1945), non-voting delegate to the United States House of Representatives for the United States Virgin Islands
 Thomas Costa (1912–2003), member of the New Jersey General Assembly from 1968 to 1972 who served as mayor of Teaneck from 1966 to 1969
 John P. Cronan (born 1976), lawyer and former Assistant Attorney General in the United States Department of Justice who is a nominee to be a United States district judge of the United States District Court for the Southern District of New York (B)
 Eileen Dickinson (born 1949), politician who has served in the Vermont House of Representatives since 2009 (B)
 Matthew Feldman (1919–1994), mayor of Teaneck from 1960 to 1966; member of the New Jersey Senate for 1966–1968 and 1974–1994
 Steven Goldstein, LGBT activist and founder of Garden State Equality
 Nelson G. Gross (1932–1997), politician who served in the New Jersey General Assembly and as chairman of the New Jersey Republican State Committee
 Mohammed Hameeduddin (born ), mayor of Teaneck, first Muslim mayor in Bergen County
 Archibald C. Hart (1873–1935), represented New Jersey's 6th congressional district, 1912–1913 and 1913–1917
 Edward H. Hynes (born 1946), politician who served two terms in the New Jersey General Assembly (B)
 Elie Katz (born 1974), former mayor of Teaneck (B)
 Florence Breed Khan (1875–1950), political hostess
 Eleanor Kieliszek (1925–2017), first woman elected to the Teaneck Township Council (1970–2000) and first woman elected mayor of Teaneck (1974–1978, 1990–1992)
 Theodora Lacey (born 1932), educator, civil rights activist, and leader of the effort to desegregate Teaneck's public schools
 Luis Muñoz Marín (1898–1980), first democratically elected Governor of Puerto Rico
 Gabrielle Kirk McDonald (born 1942), federal and international judge
 Dennis McNerney, former County Executive of Bergen County
 Michael W. Moynihan (–1996), advocate of free trade who worked in the United States government and for international trade organizations (B)
 Peter Pace (born 1945), former Chairman of the Joint Chiefs of Staff; first Marine to hold the position
 Arnold Petersen (1885–1976), National Secretary of the Socialist Labor Party of America from 1914 to 1969
 William Walter Phelps (1839–1894), member of the United States House of Representatives who served as Envoy Extraordinary and Minister Plenipotentiary to Germany
 Christopher Porrino (born 1967), lawyer who became Acting New Jersey Attorney General in June 2016 (B)
 Anthony Principi (born 1944), United States Secretary of Veterans Affairs 2001–2005
 Elizabeth Randall (born 1954), politician who served in the New Jersey General Assembly from 1986 to 1992, representing the 39th Legislative District(B)
 Adam Szubin, politician who has served as the Acting Secretary of the Treasury of the United States
 Carmen E. Turner (1931–1992), first African-American woman to head a major public transit agency, the Washington Metropolitan Area Transit Authority
 Paul A. Volcker, Jr. (1927–2019), Chairman of the Federal Reserve during 1979–1987, and son of Paul A. Volcker, Sr., Teaneck's first Municipal Manager
 Loretta Weinberg (born 1935), Majority Leader of the New Jersey Senate
 Craig Zucker (born 1975), member of the Maryland Senate

Sports

 Brooke Ammerman (born 1990), ice hockey forward who was the first player to score a goal in Metropolitan Riveters history
 Robby Anderson (born 1993), wide receiver for the New York Jets
 Lance Ball (born 1985), former running back for the Denver Broncos
 Beth Beglin (born 1957), three-time member of the United States women's national field hockey team at the Summer Olympics
 Dellin Betances (born 1988), pitcher for the New York Mets and New York Yankees
 Jim Bouton (1939–2019), former pitcher for the New York Yankees, sportscaster and author of the controversial tell-all book Ball Four
 Chris Brantley (born 1970), wide receiver who played in the NFL for the Los Angeles Rams and Buffalo Bills
 Rosey Brown (1932–2004), offensive tackle who played for the New York Giants from 1953 to 1965
 Tony Campbell (born 1962), former NBA basketball player for the New York Knicks and several other teams
 Sam Cassell (born 1969), NBA player who lived here while playing for the New Jersey Nets
 Sal Cenicola (born 1960), professional boxer recognized by the Guinness Book of World Records for the longest interval between professional boxing matches
 Rick Cerone (born 1954), former MLB catcher; played for both the New York Mets and New York Yankees
 Carlos Clark (born 1996), footballer who plays as a defensive midfielder for the Albany Great Danes men's soccer team and the Puerto Rican national team
 T. J. Clemmings (born 1991), NFL offensive tackle for the Washington Redskins
 Mike DeGerick (born 1943), pitcher who played two games for the Chicago White Sox before a line drive hit his head and ended his career
 Alison Desir, author, activist and runner
 Lawrence Frank (born 1970), former Head Coach of the New Jersey Nets
 Mike Fraysse (born 1943), US Olympic Cycling Coach; inducted into the United States Bicycling Hall of Fame
 Zach Freemantle (born 2000), college basketball player for the Xavier Musketeers
 Doug Glanville (born 1970), baseball player who played for the Philadelphia Phillies and other teams
 Steve Goepel (born 1949), former football player and coach (B)
 Tamba Hali (born 1983), former NFL linebacker for the Kansas City Chiefs of the NFL, born in Liberia but attended high school in Teaneck
 Kevin Herget (born 1991), professional baseball pitcher for the Tampa Bay Rays
 Elston Howard (1929–1980), baseball player New York Yankees
 Zab Judah (born 1977), champion welterweight boxer
 Bob Klapisch (born 1957), sportswriter for The Record
 Maya Lawrence (born 1980), fencer and part of the United States Fencing Team at the 2012 Summer Olympics in London, where she won a bronze medal in the women's team épée
 Carl "Spider" Lockhart (1943–1986), safety who played his entire 11-year career with the New York Giants
 Ryan Malleck (born 1993), American football tight end for the Houston Texans of the National Football League (B)
 James Margolis (born 1936), fencer who represented the United States in the individual and team épée events at the 1960 Summer Olympics in Rome
 Mike Massenzio (born 1982), mixed martial artist; has competed as a Middleweight in the Ultimate Fighting Championship
 Jim McGovern (born 1965), professional golfer (B)
 Christina McHale (born 1992), tennis player (B)
 Hank Morgenweck (1929–2007), Major League Baseball umpire, 1970–1975; called Nolan Ryan's fourth no-hitter
 John Orsino (1938–2016), Major League Baseball catcher who played for the San Francisco Giants (1961–1962), Baltimore Orioles (1963–1965) and Washington Senators (1966–1967) (B)
 Randi Patterson (born 1985), professional soccer player who played for the New York Red Bulls
 Kasib Powell (born 1981), NBA basketball player who has played for the Miami Heat
 Jean Prioleau (born 1970), head coach of the San Jose State Spartans men's basketball team
 David Reed (born 1988), professional soccer player
 Seth Roland (born 1957), former soccer player who has been coach of the Fairleigh Dickinson Knights men's soccer team.
 Giuseppe Rossi (born 1987), Italian-American association football player, currently playing for Genoa C.F.C. and Italy national football team
 Nick Saviano (born 1956), former tennis player; won one ATP title and reached two other finals
 Jason Sehorn (born 1971), former NFL football player who played cornerback for the New York Giants (1994–2002) and St. Louis Rams (2003)
 Steve Siegel (born 1948), former professional tennis player who played briefly on the international tennis circuit in the 1970s
 John Sterling (born 1948), sportscaster for the New York Yankees
 David Stern (1942–2020), former commissioner of the National Basketball Association
 Kamali Thompson (born 1991), fencer and physician
 Quentin Walker (born 1961, class of 1979), former running back who played in the NFL for the St. Louis Rams
 Doug Wark (born 1951), former soccer forward who spent five seasons in the North American Soccer League and three in the Major Indoor Soccer League
 David West (born 1980), NBA basketball player with the New Orleans/Oklahoma City Hornets
 Brandon Wimbush (born 1996), quarterback for the Notre Dame Fighting Irish football team (B)
 Dave Winfield (born 1951), Hall of Fame baseball player
 Ahmed Zayat (born 1962), thoroughbred racehorse owner whose horse American Pharoah won the Triple Crown in 2015

Other
 Mickey Featherstone (born 1949), mobster and leader of The Westies gang
 Martin Fleisher (born 1958), bridge player and attorney; won bridge world championship in 2017
 Rabbi Howard Jachter, specialist in Jewish divorce procedure
 Frank Lucas (1930–2019), drug lord in Harlem in the 1970s, and the subject of the 2007 biopic American Gangster
 Marty Ravellette (1938–2007), armless hero
 David Sklansky (born 1947), professional poker player and author
 Rabbi Jeremy Wieder (born 1971), rosh yeshiva and instructor at Yeshiva University's Rabbi Isaac Elchanan Theological Seminary

References

Teaneck